The Zanzibari Cup is the top knockout football tournament in Zanzibar.

The first edition of the cup was in 1926. However, the cup was rarely played, as Zanzibari clubs usually participate in the Nyerere Cup or the Mapinduzi Cup together with clubs from Tanzania mainland.

A Zanzibari FA Cup was organized starting from 2019, with the winners qualifying for the CAF Confederation Cup.

Winners 
1926: Mnazi Mmoja 1-0 New Kings
1931: PWD
1994: Malindi
2005: Final between Mafunzo and Chipukizi (unknown winner)
2019: Malindi 0–0 (4–2 pen.) JKU
2020: abandoned
2021: Mafunzo 1-1 (4–3 pen.) KVZ
2022:

References

Football competitions in Zanzibar
National association football cups
Recurring sporting events established in 1926